Kyocera Unimerco A/S is an international manufacturer, distributor and service company. The company comprises a tooling division (Kyocera Unimerco Tooling) offering optimisation services and tooling solutions for machining as well as measuring and gauging tools for the manufacturing industries, and a fastening division (Kyocera Unimerco Fastening) supplying primarily nailers, finish nailers and staplers as well as accessories and fasteners for the building industry.

The group was founded in Denmark in 1964 under the name Unimerco. In 2011, all activities were acquired by Kyocera's Germany-based subsidiary Kyocera Fineceramics GmbH.

References

External links 
 International website of the Kyocera Unimerco group
 International website of Kyocera Unimerco Fastening

Kyocera
Danish companies established in 1964
Tool manufacturing companies of Denmark